Ga-Sebotse, also known as Pinkie, is a large village in Ga-Matlala in the Blouberg Local Municipality of the Capricorn District Municipality of the Limpopo province of South Africa. It is located 73 km northwest of Polokwane and 37 km southwest of Senwabarwana.

Demographics 
An overwhelming majority of the villagers' ethnicity is African, with a small minority of South Asian shopowners and mixed-race offspring, mostly young children. The main language spoken is Northern Sotho (the Sepedi dialect). Xitsonga and Urdu are the prominent minority languages. The religion of Christianity is dominant, although it is now under heavy challenge from the newly introduced religion of Islam.

Employment 
There is a high rate of unemployment in Ga-Sebotse mainly due to the fact that very little infrastructure exists and the main urban centres of the province are located far away from the settlement. Another factor is that Aganang is a rural municipality. However, residents of village are also set to benefit from the development of the Tibane Shopping Centre through employment opportunities. The new shopping centre will be located in Tibane, about 16 km southeast. It is also expected that the crime rate will be reduced as the many unemployed youths of the settlement and surrounding areas are going to seek employment opportunities at the location.

Education 
 Noko Secondary School
 Nare-Mohlalerwa Primary School
 Pinkie-Sebotse Crèche, previously known as Lesibana Pre-School
Kwena Pulana Crèche

There is no institution of higher learning in Ga-Sebotse. The majority of successful matriculants opt for the University of Limpopo's Turfloop Campus to further their studies, while others opt for universities based in Gauteng.

Infrastructure 
Although there has been a great deal of development since 1994, there is still much to be done in terms of service delivery. Electricity was first introduced in 2006 and piped, running water in 2011. The road from Mamehlabe to Ga-Lamola (Rosenkrantz) was to be tarred in a project set for 2013 but failed to yield the much anticipated results, the tarred road that was constructed runs for a few kilometers and is of poor quality. Others infrastructure still needed in the village include a post office, telecommunication towers, sports and recreation facilities.

Sports 
Football (Soccer) is the most popular sport in Ga-Sebotse.
There are three football clubs, which are:
Pinkie Roman F.C.
Majane F.C.
Wanderers F.C.

Netball is most popular among teenage girls and young women. However, currently the netball teams in the village are defunct. It is not clear as to what exactly led to this occurrence.

References 

Populated places in the Blouberg Local Municipality